Leonardo Mantelli (born Prato, 7 December 1996) is an Italian rugby union player.
His usual position is as a Fly-Half and he currently plays for Colorno in Top12.

For 2019–20 Pro14 season, he named like Additional Player for Zebre in Pro 14.

In 2016 Mantelli was named in the Italy Under 20 squad and in 2017, he also was named in the Emerging Italy squad.

References

External links
It's Rugby France Profile
Rugby Pass Profile

Italian rugby union players
1996 births
Living people
Rugby union fly-halves